The Büyükşehir Belediyesi Ankara Spor Kulübü is a professional men’s ice hockey team founded in 1978 in Ankara, Turkey that participates in the Turkish Hockey SuperLig (TBHSL). The team plays out of the Ankara Ice Palace.

The men’s club has won a record seven league championships, winning its first in the league’s inaugural season, 1992–93.

Season-by-season record
Turkish Ice Hockey Super League

Men’s roster (2009-2010)

References

Ice hockey teams in Turkey
Turkish Ice Hockey Super League teams
Sports teams in Ankara
Ice hockey clubs established in 1978
1978 establishments in Turkey